What Every Woman Wants may refer to:

 What Every Woman Wants (1919 film), an American silent film
 What Every Woman Wants (1954 film), a British film directed by Maurice Elvey
 What Every Woman Wants (1962 film), a British film
 What Every Woman Wants (retail chain) - a Scottish chain of discount clothing stores which existed from 1972 to 1994